Whitehaven Coal is an Australian coal mining company.

History
Whitehaven Coal was established in February 1999. In September 2000, mining operations commenced at the Canyon open cut mine near Gunnedah. Further mines were established at Werris Creek in September 2005 and Tarrawonga in June 2006 before the company listed on the Australian Securities Exchange in June 2007.

In June 2011, Whitehaven was granted approval to operate trains in its own right by the Australian Rail Track Corporation to the Port of Newcastle via the Main Northern railway line. In 2012, Nathan Tinkler made an unsuccessful attempt to take over the company. In 2015, the Maules Creek coal mine opened.  The project was controversial and opposed by a coalition for traditional owners, farmers and environmentalists.

Assets

Current
Werris Creek mine, opened 2005, 100% shareholding 
Tarrawaonga coal mine, opened 2006, 100% shareholding 
Sunnyside coal mine, opened 2008, closed 2012, reopened 2017, 100% ownership
Narrabri coal mine, opened 2012, 78% shareholding
Maules Creek coal mine, opened 2015, 75% shareholding

Former
Canyon coal mine, opened 2000, closed 2009, 100% ownership
Rocglen coal mine, opened 2008, closed 2019, 100% ownership

References

Coal companies of Australia
Companies based in Sydney
Companies listed on the Australian Securities Exchange
Non-renewable resource companies established in 1999
1999 establishments in Australia